The Soul of Ike & Tina is a compilation album by R&B duo Ike & Tina Turner. Not to be confused by their 1961 debut album, The Soul of Ike & Tina Turner, this album was released by Kent Records in 1966.

Content and release 
After four years with Sue Records, Ike & Tina Turner signed with Kent Records in 1964. Kent was the follow-up to the bankrupted Modern Records. On the Kent label they released their first live album, Ike & Tina Turner Revue Live, and a few singles.

Ike Turner wrote all of the songs on The Soul of Ike & Tina. The track "Good Bye, So Long" was released as single on the newly revived Modern Records. It reached No. 34 on the Billboard's R&B Singles chart and No. 107 on Bubbling Under The Hot 100. The second single "I Don't Need," also released on Modern, reached No. 134 on Bubbling Under The Hot 100. Tina Turner made a solo appearance on Shindig! to promote the single in August 1965. She also performed the B-side "Gonna Have Fun" on Hollywood A Go-Go the next month. A third single, "I Wish My Dream Would Come True", was released by Kent in 1967.

Reissues 

In 2007, The Soul of Ike & Tina was reissued on CD by P-Vine Records with 13 additional tracks.

Track listing

The Kent Years   

The Kent Years is a compilation of recordings the Ike & Tina Turner recorded for Kent Records and Modern Records in 1964 and 1965. Released by Kent Soul in 2000, the album features most of the album The Soul of Ike & Tina with some additional tracks, including five previously unreleased songs.

Track listing

References 

1966 compilation albums
Ike & Tina Turner compilation albums
Albums produced by Ike Turner
Kent Records albums
2000 compilation albums